Cold contact may refer to:

Cold contact (marketing), a sales strategy also known as cold calling
Cold contact (switch), a particular switch or relay contact 
Cold contact (soldering), a cold soldering joint

See also
Cold junction (disambiguation)
Cold fusion (disambiguation)
Cold joint
Dry contact